Roland Green (born 29 July 1974 in Victoria, British Columbia) is a retired Canadian mountain bike and road bicycle racer. Green was a member of the Canadian Olympic Mountain Bike Racing Team for the 2000 Summer Olympics, held in Sydney, Australia. He was a Commonwealth gold medalist at the 2002 Commonwealth Games in Manchester, England, winning the MTB event on the same day as his birthday. Green dominated the world cup circuit of cross-country mountain biking from 2000 until 2003, becoming world champion in both 2001 and 2002. 
Roland also is the record holder of the Mount Doug Hill climb in his hometown of Victoria BC, Canada with a fast 4Min. 39sec which nobody has broken in 10 years.
He was named VeloNews' Mountain Bike Man of the Year in 1999 and Canada's Male Cyclist of the Year in 2000. Green retired at the end of the 2005 racing season.

Palmarès

1996
2nd Tour of Hawaii Time Trial
4th World Championships, U-23 category
1st  Canadian National XC Championships
3rd Tour of Malaysia Road Race
1997
7th World Championships
2nd Canadian National XC Championships
1998
4th Overall, NORBA NCS
1st  Canadian National XC Championships
1999
1st Overall, NORBA NCS Short Track XC
1st Overall, NORBA Short Track Championship
3rd Overall, NORBA NCS
1st NORBA NCS #6, Mt. Snow, Vermont
2nd NORBA NCS #5, Deer Valley, Utah
3rd NORBA NCS #1, Snow Summit, California
2nd Tour of the Rockies, Colorado
1at Time Trial Stage, Tour of the Redlands
Bronze medal, World Team Relay Championships
2000
2nd World Championships, Spain
4th World Cup #1
14th, 2000 Summer Olympic Games
1st Overall, Whistler International Classic Stage Race
2001
1st UCI World Championships, Vail, Colorado
1st Overall, UCI World Cup
1st UCI World Cup, Houffalize, Belgium
1st UCI World Cup, Mont St. Anne, Canada
2nd UCI World Cup, Grouse Mountain, British Columbia
2nd UCI World Cup, Sarentino, Italy
1st Overall, NORBA NCS XC Series
1st NORBA NCS XC, Snowshoe, West Virginia
1st NORBA NCS XC, Mammoth, California
1st NORBA NCS XC, Mt. Snow, Vermont
2nd NORBA NCS XC, Big Bear, California
1st Overall, NORBA NC STXC Series
1st NORBA NCS STXC, Snowshoe, West Virginia
1st NORBA NCS STXC, Mammoth, California
1st NORBA NCS STXC, Mt. Snow, Vermont
3rd NORBA NCS STXC, Big Bear, California
1st  Canadian National Championships
1st UCI World Cup Team Relay, Vail, Colorado
2nd Overall, Sea Otter Classic, Monterey, California
1st Cross Country, Sea Otter Classic, Monterey, California
3rd Redlands Road Race, California
2002
1st UCI World Championships, Kuprun, Austria
1st  Commonwealth Games, MTB Race, Manchester, England
2nd Cross-Country World Cup, Madrid, Spain
5th Cross-Country World Cup, Houffalize, Belgium
5th Cross-Country World Cup Finals, Les Gets, France
1st Norba NCS XC, Troy, Wisconsin
1st Norba NCS XC, Durango, Colorado
1st Norba NCS XC, Mt. Snow, Vermont
1st Norba NCS XC, Showshoe, West Virginia
1st Norba NCS STXC, Troy, Wisconsin
1st Norba NCS STXC, Mt. Snow, Vermont
3rd Norba NCS STXC, Snowshoe Mountain, West Virginia
2003
1st  Canadian National MTB Championships
1st NORBA NCS XC, Mt. Snow, Vermont
1st NORBA NCS XC, Sand Point, Idaho
1st Overall, Sea Otter Classic
1st Stage 1, Sea Otter Classic
1st Stage 3, Sea Otter Classic
1st Stage 4, Sea Otter Classic
2nd Overall, Subaru Nova Desert Classic
1st Stage 2, Subaru Nova Desert Classic
1st Stage 3, Subaru Nova Desert Classic
3rd World Cup #3, Mont-Sainte-Anne, Canada
3rd NORBA NCS XC, Mt. Snow, Vermont
3rd Stage 2, Redlands Classic
4th Stage 4, Dodge Tour de Georgia

References

https://web.archive.org/web/20100225093131/http://www.victoria-cycling.com/MountDougHillClimb.html

External links
An interview with Roland Green after retirement

1974 births
Living people
Canadian male cyclists
Cross-country mountain bikers
Sportspeople from Victoria, British Columbia
Commonwealth Games gold medallists for Canada
Cyclists at the 2002 Commonwealth Games
Cyclists at the 2000 Summer Olympics
Cyclists from British Columbia
Olympic cyclists of Canada
UCI Mountain Bike World Champions (men)
Canadian mountain bikers
Commonwealth Games medallists in cycling
Medallists at the 2002 Commonwealth Games